Jürgen Kessel (born 5 September 1937) is a German volleyball player. He competed in the men's tournament at the 1968 Summer Olympics.

References

1937 births
Living people
German men's volleyball players
Olympic volleyball players of East Germany
Volleyball players at the 1968 Summer Olympics
Volleyball players from Berlin
20th-century German people